Hiram Evans is the name of:

Hiram Kinsman Evans (1863–1941), U.S. Representative from Iowa
Hiram Wesley Evans (1881–1966), Imperial Wizard of the second Ku Klux Klan

See also
 For other uses and people with the given name Hiram, see Hiram (disambiguation)
 For other people with the surname Evans, see List of people with surname Evans